A Gentleman of Paris is a 1931 British crime drama film directed by Sinclair Hill and starring Arthur Wontner, Vanda Gréville and Hugh Williams. It is based on the story "His Honour, the Judge" by Niranjan Pal.

It was made at Cricklewood and Lime Grove Studios.

Cast
 Arthur Wontner as Judge Le Fevre
 Vanda Gréville as Paulette Gerrard
 Hugh Williams as Gaston Gerrard
 Phyllis Konstam as Madeleine 
 Sybil Thorndike as Lola Duval
 Arthur Goullet as Bagot
 George Merritt as M. Duval
 Frederick Lloyd as Advocate
 George De Warfaz as Valet
 Dylan Rees as barista
 Florence Wood as Concierge
Corin Dickly as Professor Beardson

References

Bibliography
Wood, Linda. British Films, 1927–1939. British Film Institute, 1986.

External links
 
 British Film Institute Review of the film http://www.bfi.org.uk/whatson/bfi_southbank/events/seniors_free_matinee_a_gentleman_of_paris

1931 films
British black-and-white films
British crime drama films
1931 crime drama films
Films based on Indian novels
Films set in Paris
Gainsborough Pictures films
Films shot at Cricklewood Studios
Films shot at Lime Grove Studios
Films directed by Sinclair Hill
1930s English-language films
1930s British films